Mora Municipality may refer to the following places:

 Mora, New Mexico, a town in northern part of the state
 Mora Municipality, Portugal, district of Évora
 Mora, Spain, province of Toledo, autonomous community of Castile-La Mancha
 Mora Municipality, Sweden, county of Dalarna